Ambleside Days is an album by jazz pianist John Taylor and John Surman, recorded and released in 1992 on Ah Um Records. Ambleside is a town in Cumbria, North West England. The album has been long out of print.

Track listing
"Lodore Falls" - 5:40
"Wandering" - 5:05	
"Ambleside Days" - 10:53
"Scale Force" - 4:21
"Coniston Fells" - 5:48
"Pathway" - 2:26
"Clapperclowe" - 5:05
"Dry Stone" - 6:39

Personnel
John Taylor - piano
John Surman - soprano and baritone saxophone, alto and bass clarinet

References

1992 albums
John Taylor (jazz) albums
John Surman albums